Some Sucker's Life, Part 1: Demos and Lost Recordings is Paula Kelley's third solo album. The album is a collection of songs that were unreleased. It was released in April 2006.

Track listing
"High Boots"
"Born to be a Star"
"Burnin' For You"
"Talk Away"
"B.S. I Love You"
"Firewalker"
"Your Big World"
"Over Your Head"
"Goodbye September"
"Life Isn't Fair"
"The Big Deal"
"Girl of the Day"
"Soaking"
"Damaged"
"You're Up"
"Untitled"

Paula Kelley albums
2006 compilation albums